Dainis 'The Titan' Zageris (born 19 July 1982) is a Latvian strongman competitor and regular entrant to the Strongman Champions League. He has competed in 86 International strongman competitions (sixth highest in history) and has won 15 of them, making him the ninth most decorated strongman in history.

Personal Records
Deadlift (Raw) -  (Push-Pull Bench Press and Deadlift Championship, Latvia - 2012) 
Bench press (Raw) –  (Push-Pull Bench Press and Deadlift Championship, Latvia - 2012) 
Log press -  (2018 SBD World Log Lift Championships)

References

 
1982 births
Living people
Latvian strength athletes